Timberjack was a brand of forestry machinery.

Timberjack may also refer to:
 Timberjack, archaic term for a lumberjack
 Timberjack, a tool similar to a peavey
 Timberjack (film), a 1955 film starring Sterling Hayden